Peyton Derek Hillis (born January 21, 1986) is a former American football running back who played in the National Football League (NFL). Hillis attended Conway High School in Conway, Arkansas, and was a highly touted recruit. Hillis attended the University of Arkansas where he was primarily used as a fullback. After being drafted in the seventh round of the 2008 NFL Draft, Hillis rose to the top of the depth chart as the starting fullback for the Denver Broncos. Due to injuries to the running back corps, he became the starting running back. After spending two years in Denver, Hillis was traded to the Cleveland Browns in 2010. In 2011, Hillis won a nationwide vote which put him on the cover of EA Sports' Madden NFL 12 video game.

College career 
After a high school career that saw him ranked as the #119 player in the country for the 2004 recruiting class, Peyton chose to attend college at the University of Arkansas from 2004 to 2007, majoring in Sociology. He chose Arkansas over a number of other offers from schools such as Oklahoma, Nebraska, Alabama, Florida, Oklahoma State, Tennessee, and LSU. 

As a true freshman, Hillis gained 240 yards rushing, 97 yards receiving, and scored eight touchdowns, ranking fourth in the SEC in total touchdowns and tying Georgia's Thomas Brown for most touchdowns scored by a SEC freshman that year.

During his sophomore year, Hillis accounted for 947 all-purpose yards (including more than 200 in kick-off and punt returns) and seven touchdowns while also serving as a blocker for up-and-coming star running backs Darren McFadden and Felix Jones.

In his junior season, Hillis only appeared in ten games due to a nagging injury, although he did return late in the season to help Arkansas win the 2006 SEC Western Division Championship. That team finished 10-4 after losing to Wisconsin in the 2007 Capital One Bowl. The biggest victory of the season came on November 11 with ESPN College GameDay in attendance, Arkansas defeated #13 Tennessee in Fayetteville, 31-14. 

His senior season in 2007 saw Hillis finish with over 800 yards of total offense and score 7 total touchdowns. Although this team did not meet pre-season expectations, finishing 8–5 after losing to Missouri in the 2008 Cotton Bowl, Hillis did help Arkansas upset #1 LSU in Baton Rouge in triple overtime, 50-48. Hillis had 11 carries for 89 yards rushing and 2 TDs, as well as 5 receptions for 62 receiving yards and 2 more TDs. It was Arkansas' first victory over a #1 team since defeating Texas in 1981. 

Over his four seasons as a fullback at Arkansas, Hillis helped paved the way for Darren McFadden to become the Razorbacks all-time rushing leader with three straight 1,000 yard seasons from 2005 to 2007, as well as two straight for fellow running back Felix Jones in 2006 and 2007. Arkansas was one of the most prolific running teams in the nation over those three seasons, owed in no small part to Hillis' blocking and receiving prowess.

College career statistics

Professional career

Denver Broncos 
The Denver Broncos selected Hillis with the 20th pick in the seventh round (227th overall) of the 2008 NFL Draft. He was also assigned his college number, 22.

2008 season 
At the start of the 2008 season, Hillis was listed as the Broncos' starting fullback. He played in his first NFL regular season game on September 8, 2008, gaining 14 yards on three rushing attempts and four yards on one reception as part of a 41–14 Broncos road victory over the Oakland Raiders. Later in the season, he recorded his first career 100-yard receiving game with seven catches for 116 yards and a touchdown in a 26–17 Broncos home loss to the Miami Dolphins on November 2, 2008.

Following an injury to Ryan Torain in the Broncos 34–30 comeback road victory over the Cleveland Browns, Hillis was named Denver's starting running back. His first start at the position netted him 44 yards and two touchdowns on only 10 carries as part of a 24–20 road victory over the Atlanta Falcons. Two weeks later, he recorded his first 100-yard rushing game with 129 yards and a touchdown on 22 attempts in a 34–17 road victory over the New York Jets. The performance earned Hillis multiple honors including being named Diet Pepsi NFL Rookie of the Week as well as FedEx Ground Player of the Week alongside Broncos quarterback Jay Cutler, who was named NFL Air Player of the Week. The string of victories and accolades built up anticipation among Broncos faithful for Hillis to continue as running back for the rest of the season. However, the season already plagued with running back injuries continued, with Hillis suffering a season-ending injury in a 24–17 home win over the Kansas City Chiefs. Coming down from an acrobatic catch of a Cutler pass with his right foot planted, Hillis was hit from both sides by Chiefs' free safety Jarrad Page and cornerback Brandon Carr. The hit doubled Hillis over, causing a 2–3 inch tear in his right hamstring behind the knee, which forced him to miss the rest of the season. Despite his limited playing time, Hillis ended the 2008 season as the Broncos' leading rusher with 343 yards and five touchdowns and was expected to return as a significant offensive presence for the 2009 season.

With the loss of Hillis, depth at the running back position was practically nil and the Broncos fell to 8–8 on the season and failed to make the playoffs. Due to a lack of postseason berths in recent years, Broncos coach Mike Shanahan was fired during the offseason and replaced with Josh McDaniels. McDaniels' first order of business was to recruit new talent to fit his playing scheme, which involved adding depth to the running back position with first round draft pick Knowshon Moreno and free agent Correll Buckhalter.

2009 season 
Despite rising to the starting fullback position and becoming the leading rusher the previous year, Hillis had only 54 yards on 13 carries in the 2009 season. As the Broncos offense collapsed late-season and Hillis still saw no significant playtime, fans began speculating about a disagreement between Hillis and McDaniels as had been the case with other Shanahan carry-overs. In a postseason interview, Hillis expressed disappointment over his playing time on the season, but remained tight-lipped about the controversy, maintaining that conversations between him and McDaniels were "friendly". In the same interview, Hillis was quoted as saying his future in Denver was "up in the air". On March 14, 2010, the Broncos traded Hillis to the Cleveland Browns along with a sixth-round pick in the 2011 Draft and a conditional pick in the 2012 Draft in exchange for quarterback Brady Quinn.

Cleveland Browns

2010 season 
Hillis's arrival in Cleveland was met with anticipation after the results of his active stint in Denver during the 2008 season. During the 2010 preseason, the Browns distributed snaps evenly between Hillis, Jerome Harrison, James Davis, Chris Jennings, and Montario Hardesty (upon returning from injury). Hillis' best pre-season rushing game came in Week 2 against the St. Louis Rams when, getting the majority of the snaps, Hillis ran for 51 yards on 12 carries (4.3 YPC).

As the regular season began, Hillis' start in Cleveland began much the same way as it did in Denver, listed down the depth chart at both tight end and fullback. Also like his start in Denver, early season injuries to Harrison and Davis thrust Hillis into the starting spot for the Week 3 game versus the Baltimore Ravens. The result was a 144-yard (6.5 YPC) romp against the Ravens' staunch rushing defense, which allowed just 3.4 yards per carry in the 2009 season. Hillis also added 36 yards on seven receptions for a total of 180 all-purpose yards. The next week, Hillis again ran for over 100 yards at home against the Cincinnati Bengals, leading the Browns to their first victory in the 2010 regular season. A thigh injury in practice limited Hillis in Week 5 against the Atlanta Falcons, though Hillis did add a 19-yard reception for a touchdown, making him the first Browns player since Greg Pruitt to record touchdowns in five consecutive games, though Pruitt's came all through rushing. Coming off a bye week in Week 8, Hillis set career marks in both rushing and all-purpose yards against the New England Patriots in Week 9, finishing the game with 184 rushing yards (6.5 ypc) and 220 yards of total offense. Following this game, Hillis was named AFC Offensive Player of the Week for Week 9, the first Cleveland Browns running back to win that honor since Eric Metcalf in 1992. In week 12, Hillis joined Marshall Faulk as the only players to have achieved more than 130 yards rushing, three rushing touchdowns, and 60 yards receiving in a single game. On December 12, 2010, Hillis went over the 1,000 yard mark on an eight-yard rush, that was preceded by a 25-yard rush.

Due to his breakout season, Hillis was the Browns finalist in the Madden NFL 12 cover vote. After upsetting Ray Rice, Matt Ryan, and Super Bowl MVP Aaron Rodgers, he advanced to the finals where he faced off against Michael Vick. On April 27, 2011, Hillis was announced as the cover athlete for the game, beating out Vick with 66 percent of the vote.

2011 season 
Hillis had a difficult 2011–12 season that led him to be associated with the Madden Curse, a history of poor performance by athletes after appearing on the Madden cover. The season began with unsuccessful negotiations to extend his contract.
He had a good game in a Week 2 matchup with the Indianapolis Colts, running for 94 yards and two touchdowns, but he then sat out a game the next week against the Miami Dolphins with strep throat on the advice of his agent. Hillis then injured his hamstring twice, once in a game and once in practice, limiting his performance and frustrating teammates. He rebounded towards the end of the season, rushing for 99 yards in Arizona and 112 in Baltimore to finish with 587 and three touchdowns. At the end of the year, Hillis stated he wanted to re-sign with the Browns, even willing to offer a hometown discount, but the Browns never made him an offer and allowed him to leave as a free agent to Kansas City.

Kansas City Chiefs 
On March 14, 2012, Hillis signed with the Kansas City Chiefs. He finished the 2012 season with 309 yards on 85 carries as a backup to Jamaal Charles.

Tampa Bay Buccaneers 
On July 23, 2013, Hillis signed with the Tampa Bay Buccaneers. On September 21, 2013, Hillis was released by the Buccaneers without appearing in a game.

New York Giants 
On October 16, 2013, the New York Giants announced they had signed Hillis for the 2013–14 season. On March 11, 2014, the Giants gave Hillis a $1.8 million contract extension for two more years. Before the start of the 2014 season, Hillis agreed to change his number from #44 to #33, so that rookie Andre Williams could wear the number he wore in college. Hillis had also worn number 33 while in training camp with the Buccaneers.

On February 25, 2015, the Giants announced the release of Hillis.

Retirement 
Hillis retired in 2015, at his doctor's behest due to his history of concussions and the potential of future injury. Hillis also claimed in an interview, "as far as NFL football goes, my heart's just not in it anymore."

NFL career statistics

Personal life 

In 2021, Hillis made his acting debut in the horror movie The Hunting, directed by Mark Andrew Hamer. Hillis received top-billing in the film for his role. Set photos indicated he portrayed a werewolf.

In January 2023, Hillis was reported to be in critical condition after getting injured while saving his children from drowning. After multiple weeks in the hospital, Hillis was released from the hospital.

References

External links 

 New York Giants bio 
 Cleveland Browns bio 
 Arkansas Razorbacks bio

1986 births
Living people
People from Conway, Arkansas
Players of American football from Arkansas
American football fullbacks
Arkansas Razorbacks football players
Denver Broncos players
Cleveland Browns players
Kansas City Chiefs players
Tampa Bay Buccaneers players
New York Giants players